Milhazes, Vilar de Figos e Faria is a civil parish in the municipality of Barcelos, Portugal. It was formed in 2013 by the merger of the former parishes Milhazes, Vilar de Figos and Faria. The population in 2011 was 2,066, in an area of 12.14 km2.

References

Freguesias of Barcelos, Portugal